Euapatura is a genus of butterflies in the family Nymphalidae. It is monotypic, containing only the species Euapatura mirza found in northern Iraq.

External links
"Euapatura Ebert, 1971" at Markku Savela's Lepidoptera and Some Other Life Forms

Apaturinae
Monotypic butterfly genera
Nymphalidae genera